Expedition 46 was the 46th expedition to the International Space Station.

Sergey Volkov, Mikhail Korniyenko and Scott Kelly transferred from Expedition 45, the latter two as part of their year-long stay aboard the ISS. Expedition 46 began with the departure of Soyuz TMA-17M on 11 December 2015 and  concluded upon the departure of Soyuz TMA-18M on 1 March 2016, and the crew of Soyuz TMA-19M transferred to Expedition 47. The expedition has the first British ESA astronaut (Tim Peake) to visit the International Space Station (ISS).

Crew

Source Spacefacts

Mission highlights

Following the arrival of the Soyuz TMA-19M crew, the next vehicle manoeuvre was the departure of the Progress M-28M, on 19 December. Progress MS-1 then launched to the ISS, atop a Soyuz 2.1a, on 21 December. The same day, Commander Scott Kelly and Timothy Kopra performed a contingency EVA and successfully repaired the Mobile Base System. On 23 December, the Progress MS-1 resupply vehicle docked at the ISS.

On 8 January 2016, pupils from Sandringham School in St Albans made the first amateur radio call to a British astronaut at the International Space Station, contacting Tim Peake as part of his Principia mission.

On 15 January 2016, Tim Peake and Timothy Kopra began an EVA at 12:55 GMT. A failed voltage regulator (1B SSU) was replaced during the EVA. This EVA marked the first official spacewalk by a Briton, Tim Peake, who was wearing the Union Jack on his EMU. NASA decided to finish the spacewalk around 17:00 GMT, as Timothy Kopra reported water in his helmet. The spacesuit, which Kopra was wearing, was the same one worn by Luca Parmitano on 16 July 2013, when his helmet flooded during EVA-23 of Expedition 36.

On 23 February 2016, Scott Kelly displayed his sense of humour by wearing a gorilla suit, while chasing Tim Peake through the space station, in a recorded video with the backing track of Yakety Sax. The following day, a video message from Tim Peake was played at the 2016 Brit Awards, giving congratulations to Adele for her award.

A further EVA was also scheduled to take place during Expedition 46.

See also

ISS year long mission

References

External links

 NASA's Space Station Expeditions page

Expeditions to the International Space Station
2015 in spaceflight
2016 in spaceflight